Damien Boudjemaa (born 7 June 1985) is a French footballer of Algerian descent who plays as a midfielder and for Montreuil FC.

Club career
In the summer of 2012, there were rumors that Rapid București would be interested to sign the player for the 2012/2013 season. He continued with Petrolul, but new rumors pointed to the interest of the Ligue 1 clubs Valenciennes and Brest to transfer the player during the 2012/2013 winter break. Boudjemaa declared that he would like to play for Petrolul in European competitions, to reward the sympathy of the fans.

In February 2014, he moved to Gambrinus liga team SK Slavia Prague for undisclosed fee. He scored in his first match for Slavia Prague, the only goal in their 1-5 loss against SK Sigma Olomouc.

In January 2016, he moved to Astra Giurgiu.

Honours

Petrolul Ploieşti
 Cupa României (1): 2012–13
 Runner-up Supercupa României :2013

Astra Giurgiu
 Liga I (1): 2015–16
 Supercupa României (1): 2016

References

External links

1985 births
Living people
Footballers from Paris
Algerian footballers
French footballers
Expatriate footballers in Romania
French expatriate sportspeople in Romania
Association football midfielders
UJA Maccabi Paris Métropole players
French sportspeople of Algerian descent
Liga I players
FC Petrolul Ploiești players
Czech First League players
SK Slavia Prague players
FC Astra Giurgiu players